Gamebryo (formerly NetImmerse until 2003) is a game engine developed by Gamebase Co., Ltd. and Gamebase USA, that incorporates a set of tools and plugins including run-time libraries, supporting video game developers for numerous cross-platform game titles in a variety of genres, and served as a basis for the Creation Engine.

History 
Numerical Design Limited (NDL) was founded in 1983, mostly doing contract work for government and CAD clients in the computer graphics sector, though also some game developers such as Interactive Magic. This work led to the production of the NetImmerse game engine in 1997, evolving into Gamebryo by 2003.

NDL was merged into Emergent Game Technologies (EGT, founded 2000, Butterfly.net until May 2005) in August 2005. NetImmerse then evolved to Gamebryo LightSpeed. During 2009 the development staff of Gamebryo was downsized, and by July 2010 the engineering office in Chapel Hill, North Carolina was closed. On November 11, 2010, assets of EGT were offered for acquisition, including its intellectual Property (IP), in whole or in part.

In December 2010, Korea-based Gamebase Co., Ltd., a longtime partner of EGT, finalized the acquisition of EGT assets and technology, and established a newly capitalized U.S. company, Gamebase USA. Gamebase USA is based in the Research Triangle Park region of North Carolina and is focused on continual development of the Gamebryo game engine. The newest version, Gamebryo 4.0, was introduced in March 2012.

Features 
The Gamebryo system is a suite of modular C++ libraries. Game developers can combine and extend the libraries to modify the engine for a particular game. Gamebryo's design emphasises a rapid prototyping approach aimed at an iterative development process.

The Gamebryo engine supports several deployment platforms including Microsoft Windows (DirectX 6–11), Mac, iOS, Android, Linux (OpenGL), GameCube, Wii, PlayStation, PS2, PSP, PS3, PS4, Xbox, Xbox 360, and Xbox One.

Gamebryo 4.0 is the latest version of the engine, designed to merge the original Gamebryo system with its LightSpeed spin-off.

Games 
Gamebryo is used by numerous companies within the gaming industry. Below is a sample of titles that have used the engine:

NetImmerse games

References

Further reading

External links 
 Gamebryo official website

3D scenegraph APIs
Game engines for Linux
 
NetImmerse engine games
Video game engines